Maurice McGuire was a priest in Ireland during the 15th century.

The Rector of Aghalurcher,  he was Archdeacon of Clogher until his death on 26 April 1423.

References

15th-century Irish Roman Catholic priests
Archdeacons of Clogher
1423 deaths